Frankie "Frank" Montalvo (born May 6, 1956) is a Senior United States district judge of the United States District Court for the Western District of Texas.

Education and career

Born in Bayamón, Puerto Rico, Montalvo received a Bachelor of Science degree from the University of Puerto Rico in 1976, a Master of Science degree from the University of Michigan in 1977, and a Juris Doctor from Wayne State University Law School in 1985. He was an Engineer at General Motors from 1983 to 1988, in private practice in San Antonio, Texas from 1988 to 1994, and he was a judge on the 288th Judicial District Court of Texas from 1995 to 2003.

Federal judicial service

On May 1, 2003, Montalvo was nominated by President George W. Bush to a new seat on the United States District Court for the Western District of Texas created by 116 Stat. 1758. He was confirmed by the United States Senate on July 31, 2003, and received his commission on August 1, 2003. He assumed senior status on December 1, 2022.

See also
List of Hispanic/Latino American jurists

References

Sources

1956 births
Living people
Hispanic and Latino American judges
Judges of the United States District Court for the Western District of Texas
People from Bayamón, Puerto Rico
United States district court judges appointed by George W. Bush
21st-century American judges
University of Michigan alumni
University of Puerto Rico alumni
Wayne State University Law School alumni
Texas state court judges